Abayomi is a Nigerian masculine name of Yoruba origin meaning my enemies tried to mock me but God didn't allow them. The full form is Ota ibà yomi sugbon Ọlọ́run òjé.

Notable people with the name includes:

Given name
Abayomi Ajayi (born 1961), Nigerian gynecologist
Abayomi Barber, Nigerian contemporary artist 
Abayomi Mighty (born 1985), Nigerian youth ambassador to the United Natons
Abayomi Olonisakin, Nigerian Chief of Defence Staff
Abayomi Owonikoko Seun (born 1992), Nigerian-Georgian football player

Surname
John Augustus Abayomi-Cole (1848–1943), Sierra Leonean medical doctor and herbalist 
Kofo Abayomi (1896–1979), Nigerian ophthalmologist
Oyinkansola Abayomi (1897–1990), Nigerian nationalist and feminist

References

Yoruba given names
Yoruba-language surnames